Ross Dowd (April 17, 1907 – August 25, 1965) was an American set decorator. He was nominated for two Academy Awards in the category Best Art Direction.

Selected filmography
Dowd was nominated for two Academy Awards for Best Art Direction:
 The Facts of Life (1960)
 Around the World in 80 Days (1956)

References

External links

American set decorators
1907 births
1965 deaths